Jacobus Cornelius 'Japie' Mulder (born 18 October 1969), is a former South African rugby union player who played for South Africa between 1994 and 2001.

He is now an employee of the telecommunications infrastructure company, Dark Fibre Africa (Pty) Ltd.

On 29 December 2009, Mulder and his wife and children were hijacked in the East Rand. Mulder was forced into the boot in the car, while his hijackers stole money from his bank account.

Career

Provincial
In 1993 he was selected for the South African Barbarians to tour the United Kingdom and in 1994 he played for the South African A-team. He was a member of the Transvaal team that won the Currie Cup in 1993 and 1994, as well as the 1993 Super 10.

International 
He played his first test match for the Springboks on 23 July 1994 against New Zealand at Athletic Park in Wellington. Mulder played in 34 test matches, including four during the 1995 Rugby World Cup. He also played in fifteen tour matches, scoring three tries, to add to his six test tries.

Test history 
 World Cup Final

World Cup
 1995 : World Champions, 4 caps, (Wallabies, Samoa, France, All Blacks).

See also
List of South Africa national rugby union players – Springbok no. 617

References

External links
Springboks in 1996
scrum.com statistics

1969 births
Living people
People convicted of attempted rape
People convicted of indecent assault
South African rugby union players
South Africa international rugby union players
Rugby union centres
Golden Lions players
Lions (United Rugby Championship) players
Rugby union players from Gauteng